"Ohio Is for Lovers" (also known as simply "Ohio") is a song by American rock band Hawthorne Heights. It was released as the debut single in 2004 from their debut full-length studio album, The Silence in Black and White. It was produced by Jay Orpin. According to lead vocalist JT Woodruff, the song is about going on tour whilst leaving their girlfriends behind in Ohio. The song is frequently considered the band's signature song and has been jokingly referred to as "The Emo Anthem" for its lyrical content. It peaked at #34 on the Billboard Alternative Songs Chart. When the music video for the song began getting airplay on MTV, it gave the band widespread popularity, resulting in The Silence in Black and White being certified gold in the United States.

An acoustic version of the track was recorded on the album's re-issue.

Music video

The music video was directed by Shane Drake. The video features footage of the band performing in an old building while a little girl is shown aging rapidly and a spider is spinning its web. According to JT Woodruff, the band members were wearing each other's clothing and the microphone was hanging from the ceiling because they forgot to bring the stand.

Personnel

JT Woodruff - lead vocals, rhythm guitar
Matt Ridenour - bass guitar, backing vocals
Micah Carli - lead guitar
Eron Bucciarelli - drums
Casey Calvert - rhythm guitar, unclean vocals

Chart performance

References

2005 debut singles
Songs about heartache
Hawthorne Heights songs
2004 songs
Music videos directed by Shane Drake